Kumulamunai Maha Vidhyalayam is a   provincial school in Kumulamunai, Mullaitivu District, Sri Lanka. School girls studying in this school were among those killed in the Chencholai bombing.

See also
 List of schools in Northern Province, Sri Lanka

References

Provincial schools in Sri Lanka
Schools in Mullaitivu District